Warszawa Praga railway station is a railway station in the Targówek district of Warsaw, Poland. As of 2011, it is used by Koleje Mazowieckie, that run the KM9 services from Warszawa Wola or Warszawa Zachodnia through the north of the Masovian Voivodeship to Działdowo, in the Warmian-Masurian Voivodeship via Legionowo, Nasielsk, Modlin, Ciechanów and Mława, at all of which some trains terminate, and by Szybka Kolej Miejska, who run services to Wieliszew, with some trains terminating at Legionowo or Legionowo Piaski.

References
Station article at kolej.one.pl

External links 
 

Praga
Railway stations served by Koleje Mazowieckie
Railway stations served by Szybka Kolej Miejska (Warsaw)
Targówek